McGruder is a surname that refers to:
Persons
Aaron McGruder (b. 1974), American cartoonist
Charles McGruder, progenitor of hundreds of African-Americans with the surname Magruder or McGruder
Jeanette McGruder (b. 1954), American singer
Lynn McGruder (b. 1982), American football player
Mike "Scooter" McGruder (b. 1964), American football player
Rodney McGruder (b. 1991), American basketball player

Fictional characters
Judge McGruder, fictional character in the Judge Dredd stories